The 2009 West Coast Conference Baseball Championship Series was held on May 22 and 23, 2009 at San Diego's home stadium, Patterson Baseball Complex in Spokane, Washington, and pitted the top two finishers from the WCC regular season. This would be the final postseason conference championship for the WCC until a four-team tournament was launched in 2013.

Seeding

Results
Game One

Game Two

References

West Coast Conference Baseball Championship
Tournament
Baseball competitions in Washington (state)
West Coast Conference Baseball Championship Series
West Coast Conference Baseball Championship Series
Sports competitions in Spokane, Washington
College sports tournaments in Washington (state)